The Sumatran giant shrew (Crocidura lepidura) is a shrew of the genus Crocidura. It is native to the Indonesian island of Sumatra, where it is found both in the rainforests to the west of the island and in the hillsides in the south and east.

References

External links

Crocidura
Mammals of Indonesia
Mammals described in 1908